Maamaloa Lolohea (27 May 1968 – 21 May 2020) was a Tongan weightlifter. At age forty, Lolohea made his official debut for the 2008 Summer Olympics in Beijing, where he competed in the men's super heavyweight category (+105 kg). Lolohea placed thirteenth in this event, as he successfully lifted 140 kg in the single-motion snatch, and hoisted 173 kg in the two-part, shoulder-to-overhead clean and jerk, for a total of 313 kg.

Major results

References

External links
 
NBC 2008 Olympics profile

1968 births
2020 deaths
Olympic weightlifters of Tonga
Weightlifters at the 2008 Summer Olympics
People from Tongatapu
Tongan male weightlifters
Weightlifters at the 2002 Commonwealth Games
Weightlifters at the 2006 Commonwealth Games
Commonwealth Games competitors for Tonga
20th-century Tongan people
21st-century Tongan people